Pirkkiö is a surname. Notable people with the surname include:

  (born 1979), Finnish weightlifter
 Jaarli Pirkkiö (born 1967), Finnish weightlifter
  (born 1968), Finnish weightlifter

Finnish-language surnames